Lt. Gen. Zoltán Szenes (born 23 July 1951) is a retired Hungarian military officer, who served as the Chief of the General Staff of the Armed Forces of the Republic of Hungary from 1 March 2003 to 31 January 2005.

References

Sources
CV at Magyar Hadtudományi Társaság

1951 births
Living people
People from Vas County
Hungarian military personnel